The 1994 New York State Comptroller election took place on November 8, 1994. Democratic nominee and incumbent Comptroller Carl McCall narrowly defeated Republican nominee Herbert London.

General Election Results

References

See also 

1994
Comptroller
New York